Crooked House is a 2017 mystery film directed by Gilles Paquet-Brenner, based on Agatha Christie’s 1949 novel of the same name. The film stars Max Irons, Terence Stamp, Glenn Close, Gillian Anderson, and Stefanie Martini. Principal photography began in September 2016, and the film aired in the UK on Channel 5 on 17 December 2017.

Plot 

The granddaughter of late Greek-British business tycoon Aristide Leonides, Sophia Leonides, visits private investigator Charles Hayward in his office. She wants Charles to investigate Aristide's death, and suspects he was murdered by a member of their sprawling and idiosyncratic family. Sophia notes that Aristide's regular insulin injection had been laced with eserine from his eye drops, causing a fatal heart attack. Sophia believes this was deliberate, not accidental. Charles reluctantly takes on the case, in part because he had a brief love affair with her in Cairo. Charles seeks the consent of Chief Inspector Taverner of Scotland Yard to look into the case, utilising his personal connection with Taverner, who had served with Charles's father, a decorated former Assistant Commissioner.

At the Leonides estate, Charles interviews the various members of the family, finding motives for each of them. All of them get substantial bequests from Aristide's estate but all resented the way he bullied and manipulated them.

Lady Edith de Haviland was the sister of Aristide's late first wife; she moved in to care for her motherless nephews. She despised her brother-in-law as a parvenu and for his callousness towards his grandchildren. Edith stalks around the grounds, blasting moles in the lawn with a shotgun.

Aristide's elder son, Philip, hated his father for passing him over as successor to the family business, and for refusing to fund production of a screenplay he wrote for his wife, Magda, a fading theatre actress.

Philip and Magda provided Aristide with three grandchildren: Sophia, Eustace (a teenager crippled by polio), and Josephine (a clever 12-year-old, who spies on everyone and writes it down in her notebook).

The younger son, Roger, is managing director of a major family business, but is a failure, requiring multiple bail-outs from Aristide. His domineering wife Clemency is a plant biologist with extensive knowledge of poisons.

Aristide's second wife, Brenda, is much younger, a former Las Vegas casino dancer. The others suspect her of killing Aristide, especially Roger, who denounces her as a gold-digging slut. She did administer the fatal insulin injection. Also, she is having an affair with Laurence Brown, private tutor for the Leonides children. And when Aristide's will is produced, it is unsigned. Thus he died intestate, and Brenda will inherit his entire estate.

Charles's inquiries meet with hostility from most of the family. Josephine hints that she has found clues she does not disclose, to Charles's irritation. Events take a new, horrific turn when the ladder to Josephine's treehouse is sabotaged and she falls from the tree, having to be hospitalised. Charles suspects that this was due to Josephine's habit of spying on the other family members and the killer thus wanting to silence her.

Charles' suspicions even extend to Sophia after a new, properly signed will is discovered, leaving the estate to her. Eustace even suggests that Sophia hired Charles to investigate the murder due to their personal history, knowing he would never accuse her due to their romantic past.

After those developments, Taverner arrives in person to take charge of the case; he feels Charles' romantic history with Sophia does not make him objective enough to solve it. The discovery of love letters between Brenda and Laurence gives Taverner enough evidence to arrest them for Aristide's murder and the attempt on Josephine.

Charles, however, remains unconvinced that Brenda and Laurence are guilty, noting Brenda's childlike intelligence and Laurence's pacifist, left-wing views as making them unlikely candidates for being murderers. Sophia and Edith seem to agree. Sophia notes that the letters could have been forged, and Edith insists on "the best lawyer" to represent Brenda and Laurence. Edith visits a London doctor, and learns she is dying of cancer. Charles returns to the estate after being in London when Josephine's nanny is fatally poisoned by hot chocolate that she had prepared for herself and Josephine.

Charles implores Josephine to name the killer, as he has worked out that she knows. Again, Josephine smugly refuses to tell, even when Charles warns her that she is in danger. Edith collects Josephine, and drives out of the estate (supposedly for ice cream), lying to get past the police at the gate.

The coroner finds that the nanny died of cyanide poisoning, Charles suspects Edith, who used cyanide to kill moles. He searches Edith's garden shed, and finds a bottle of cyanide; also Josephine's missing notebook, buried in quicklime that would have destroyed it.

Charles and Sophia take off in pursuit of Edith, who left a note for Charles to find in his car. Sophia reads Edith's note: it is a confession to the murder, but Charles doesn't believe it.

Sophia then starts reading from Josephine's notebook, and discovers the horrible truth: Josephine murdered Aristide. He had stopped her ballet lessons (with insulting comments), and she was bored. Josephine also staged her fall from the treehouse, poisoned the nanny, who had begun to suspect her, and forged Brenda's love letters. Lady Edith had worked out that Josephine was the killer and confessed to exonerate Brenda and Laurence, and perhaps to spare Josephine a life in psychiatric institutions and a lifetime reputation as a monster. As Charles and Sophia catch up, Edith drives off the edge of a quarry, killing herself and Josephine. The film ends as Charles comforts a shocked and sobbing Sophia at the edge of the cliff.

Cast

Production 

In 2011, US filmmaker Neil La Bute announced that he would be directing a feature film version, for 2012, of the novel with a script by Julian Fellowes. On 15 May 2011, Gemma Arterton, Matthew Goode, Gabriel Byrne and Dame Julie Andrews were announced to lead the cast. In a report issued on 10 June 2012, Sony Pictures Worldwide Acquisitions acquired all rights in the US, Canada and internationally for the film, which could help secure it a lucrative release, though the cast and creative team had changed.

Principal photography began in September 2016. Part of the filming was done at King's College London's Maughan Library.

Minley Manor near Fleet, Hampshire, was used as the location for the external shots of Three Gables (Crooked House). The interiors were shot at four different locations, including Hughenden Manor, West Wycombe House and Tyntesfield, near Bristol.

The look of the movie was created by production designer Simon Bowles.

Music 
The film's original score is by Hugo de Chaire.

Reception 
On the review aggregator website Rotten Tomatoes, the film has an approval rating of 56%, based on 25 reviews, with an average rating of 5/10. On Metacritic, the film has a weighted average score of 59 out of 100, based on 8 critics, indicating "mixed or average reviews".

References

External links 
 
 

2010s mystery films
2017 films
British mystery films
Films based on British novels
Films based on mystery novels
Films directed by Gilles Paquet-Brenner
Films with screenplays by Julian Fellowes
Films based on works by Agatha Christie
Films set in country houses
2010s English-language films
2010s British films

ja:ねじれた家#映画化